Love Me or Leave Me is the second studio album by Canadian country music artist Chad Brownlee. It was released on February 14, 2012 by MDM Recordings. The album contains the singles, "Smoke in the Rain," "Listen", and Crash", which all charted on the Canadian Hot 100.

Love Me or Leave Me was nominated for Country Album of the Year at the 2013 Juno Awards.

Track listing

Chart performance

Singles

References

2012 albums
Chad Brownlee albums
MDM Recordings albums